Fusiturricula yasila is an extinct species of sea snail, a marine gastropod mollusk in the family Drilliidae.

Distribution
This extinct species was only found in strata of Bartonian coastal sandstone of the Talara Formation (Peru); age range: 40.4 to 37.2 Ma

References

 A. A. Olsson. 1930. Contributions to the Tertiary Paleontology of Northern Peru: Part 3, Eocene Mollusca. Bulletins of American Paleontology 17(62):1–164

External links

yasila
Gastropods described in 1930
Extinct gastropods